Shomo Rock is a nunatak lying between the Ricker Hills and Pape Rock in the Prince Albert Mountains, Oates Land. Mapped by United States Geological Survey (USGS) from surveys and U.S. Navy air photos 1956–62. Named by Advisory Committee on Antarctic Names (US-ACAN) for Barry C. Shomo, equipment operator with the South Pole Station winter party of 1966.

Prince Albert Mountains
Rock formations of Oates Land